The Day It Rained on Our Parade (simplified Chinese: 那一年我们淋着雨) is a 4-part Singaporean Chinese drama produced in conjunction with National Day and the 47th anniversary of independence from the British. It starred Eelyn Kok, Cynthia Koh, Pan Lingling, Chew Chor Meng, Aileen Tan, Priscelia Chan & Ng Hui as the casts of the series. It was telecasted on Singapore's free-to-air channel, MediaCorp Channel 8. It debuted on 4 August 2012, and screened every Saturday night at 10:30 pm, with a repeat telecast at Sunday afternoons at 12:00pm. The series was dubbed in English, Malay and Tamil and aired on Channel 5, Suria and Vasantham.

Cast

 Pan Lingling as Lucy / Mu Shu Lan: She acted as the owner of Carnival Beauty Salon
 Cynthia Koh as Lu Lu 露露
 Eelyn Kok as Qiu Yan Ping 邱燕萍
 Chew Chor Meng
 Chen Huihui
 Aileen Tan as 肥妈
 Priscelia Chan as Liu Li Li 刘莉莉
 Ng Hui as Sister Maria 玛利亚修女
 Li Wenhai
 Wang Yuqing

Plot
The story is about the 1968 National Day Parade and the characters, though fictional, and events are based on eyewitness accounts.

Episodes

Production 
To celebrate Singapore's 47th National Day, MediaCorp produced a drama based on the 1968 National Day Parade (NDP). As the 1968 NDP was held on a rainy day, the drama was named after the rainy day.

See also
List of programmes broadcast by Mediacorp Channel 8

References

Singapore Chinese dramas
2012 Singaporean television series debuts
Channel 8 (Singapore) original programming